The Roman Catholic Diocese of Barretos is a diocese located in the city of Barretos in the Ecclesiastical province of Ribeirão Preto in Brazil.

History
 14 April 1973: Established as Diocese of Barretos from the Diocese of Jaboticabal and Diocese of Rio Preto

Leadership
 Bishops of Barretos (Latin Rite)
 José de Matos Pereira, C.M.F. (1973.04.25 – 1976.08.12)
 Antônio Maria Mucciolo (1977.05.26 – 1989.05.30), appointed Archbishop of Botucatu, São Paulo 
 Pedro Fré, C.Ss.R. (1989.12.02 – 2000.12.20)
 Antônio Gaspar (2000.12.20 – 2008.01.09)
 Edmilson Amador Caetano, O. Cist. (2008.01.09 – 2014.01.29), appointed Bishop of Guarulhos, São Paulo
 Milton Kenan Júnior (2014.11.05 - ...)

References
 GCatholic.org
 Catholic Hierarchy

Roman Catholic dioceses in Brazil
Christian organizations established in 1973
Barretos, Roman Catholic Diocese of
Roman Catholic dioceses and prelatures established in the 20th century